Delta was a General Motors compact front-wheel drive automobile and crossover SUV platform, originally developed by Opel Group. Delta was a successor to the  Opel T platform; it also replaced J platform and the Z platform used by the Saturn S-Series. The platform debuted in the 2003 Saturn Ion. Vehicles of this platform generally carry the letter "A" in the fourth character of their VINs.

Delta uses an independent suspension in front and Twist beam type in the rear. The Ecotec engine is widely used, as are a 4-speed automatic and 5-speed manual transmission.

Delta

Applications 
Former vehicles based on this platform:
 2003–2007 Saturn Ion
 2005–2010 Chevrolet Cobalt
 2005–2009 Pontiac G5/G4/Pursuit
 2006–2011 Chevrolet HHR

Delta II 

Delta II was General Motors' global compact car platform, developed by Opel in Germany. It was the successor to the GM Delta platform. Internally it is simply known as a new Global Compact Vehicle Architecture or GCV.

The platform features a torsion beam (marketed as compound crank) rear suspension with optional Watt's link which improves vehicle handling; such configuration is used with the Opel Astra, Cadillac ELR, Opel Cascada and higher trim-levels of the American-market Chevrolet Cruze.

This suspension is usually described as semi-independent, meaning that the two wheels can move relative to each other, but their motion is still somewhat inter-linked, to a greater extent than in a true independent rear suspension (IRS). This can mildly compromise the handling and ride quality of the vehicle. For this reason, some manufacturers have changed to different linkage designs. As an example, Volkswagen dropped the torsion beam in favour of a true IRS for the Volkswagen Golf Mk5, possibly in response to the Ford Focus' Control Blade rear suspension.

As noted, certain GM brands and models have continued to use the suspension setup, known variously as twist beam, torsion beam or compound crank suspension. This is at a cost saving of €100 per car compared to multi-link rear suspension. The version used on the 2009-on Opel Astra uses a Watts linkage at a cost of €20 to address the drawbacks and provide a competitive and cost effective rear suspension. The Renault Mégane and Citroen C4 also have stayed with the twist beam. The twist beam has been shown to suffer less from bush wear, than fully independent multi-link suspension, thus resulting in a virtually maintenance free rear suspension.

GM chose this compact vehicle architecture for its first Voltec application, the Chevrolet Volt. Production began in November 2010 with the first Chevrolet Volts delivered to retails customers in December 2010.

Applications 
Production vehicles based on Delta II platform:
 2008–2016 Chevrolet Cruze, Daewoo Lacetti Premiere, Holden Cruze
 2009–2015 Opel Astra J, Buick Excelle XT
 2010–2015 Chevrolet Volt
 2010–2018 Chevrolet Orlando
 2011–2016 Buick Verano
 2011–2015 Opel Ampera
 2011–2019 Opel Zafira Tourer C
 2013–2016 Cadillac ELR
 2013–2019 Opel Cascada (also marketed as Vauxhall Cascada, Holden Cascada, Buick Cascada and Opel Cabrio)
 2017–present Chevrolet Cavalier

D2XX/D2UX
General Motors introduced its new global platform named D2XX flexible platform in August 2012. The new platform was mainly engineered by GM's former German subsidiary Opel in Rüsselsheim. According to GM the company invested US$220 million for the all new D2XX platform.

The platform was developed for compact vehicle architecture, replacing both Delta II and the midsize crossover GM Theta platform.

Vehicles that used the new platform included:

 2015–present Chevrolet Cruze
 2015–2022 Opel Astra K
 2016–2019 Chevrolet Volt
 2018–present Chevrolet Equinox 
 2018–present GMC Terrain
 2019–present Chevrolet Orlando

GM-PATAC K 
In 2015 Pan Asia Technical Automotive Center (PATAC), GM's joint development center with SAIC, revealed their own simplified variant of D2XX, known as the "GM-PATAC K" platform (rather than "K" so as to distinguish it from the former GM K platforms). The following vehicles use this variant of the platform, none of which are sold in the United States:

 2015–present Buick Excelle GT
 2016–present Chevrolet Cavalier
 2017–present Buick GL6
 2019–present Chevrolet Monza

References

External links 

 GM Delta Enthusiasts (a part of the GM Enthusiast Network)
 "Chevy gets new compact car next year". Automotive News (2008-06-01)

Delta